Stephen Laurence Rainbow (born 26 January 1961) is a former New Zealand politician. He is manager of Auckland Transport's key relationships unit.

Biography

Early life
Stephen Rainbow was born in Christchurch in 1961. He grew up on a tobacco farm south of Nelson and was educated in Richmond at Waimea College. Later he attended Victoria University of Wellington from 1982 and graduated in 1985 with a Bachelor of Arts, and in 1991 with a PhD in Political Science.

Rainbow and his partner Anna Frusin (who was born in the Soviet Union) had three children together; Alexandra, Larissa and Solomon.

Political career
Rainbow became politically active in the 1970s joining the Labour Party and served on Labour's New Zealand Council. In 1983 he contested the Labour nomination to replace retiring party leader Bill Rowling in the Tasman seat, but lost to Ken Shirley. He did not renew his membership in 1984 and later joined the newly formed Green Party and stood for election in 1989 for the Wellington City Council on a Green ticket. He was successful and became the country's first Green councillor. The next year he contested the seat of Wellington Central for the Greens at the  general election, finishing third out of seven candidates.

Rainbow was re-elected to the Wellington City Council in 1992 and 1995. On both occasions he also stood for Mayor without success, finishing fourth in 1992 and seventh in 1995.

By 1994 Rainbow was leading the opposition to the Green Party's membership of the Alliance, a broad left-wing coalition, thinking the Alliance's emphasis on social justice type issues detracted focus from environmental issues. In 1995 Rainbow co-founded the Progressive Green Party, a "Bluegreen" environmentalist party with a more right-wing emphasis.

In 1998 Rainbow decided not to seek re-election. By that time the Progressive Greens had disbanded and most members had joined the "Bluegreen" wing of the National Party, including Rainbow. At the  general election he stood as a list only candidate for National, ranked 51 he was not allocated a seat.

Other activities
Rainbow is also a gay rights activist. He served as Chairman of Auckland-based phone support and LGBT advocacy service OUTLine and also a board member of the New Zealand AIDS Foundation. He campaigned for same sex marriage reform. 

In 2021 Rainbow was criticised for social media posts seen as transphobic.

Notes

References

1961 births
Living people
People educated at Waimea College
Victoria University of Wellington alumni
Wellington City Councillors
New Zealand Labour Party politicians
Green Party of Aotearoa New Zealand politicians
New Zealand National Party politicians
Unsuccessful candidates in the 1990 New Zealand general election
Unsuccessful candidates in the 1999 New Zealand general election